Loss Creek may refer to one of several streams:

Canada
Loss Creek (Canada), in Capital Regional District, British Columbia

United States
Loss Creek, in Spring Creek Township, Coffey County, Kansas
Loss Creek, in Black Wolf Township, Ellsworth County, Kansas
Loss Creek, a river in Ohio
Loss Creek, a tributary of the Hiwassee River in Polk County, Tennessee
Loss Creek (Texas), in Coleman County, Texas

See also
Lost Creek (disambiguation)